Gillian Zinser is an American actress. She is best known for her role as Ivy Sullivan on The CW teen drama series 90210.

Early life
Zinser was born in Washington, D.C. She is of German and Ashkenazi Jewish descent.

Career
Zinser's first appearance on television was in 2009 in an episode of the Cupid. She also made an appearance in the Cold Case series before joining the cast of 90210, where she played the role of Ivy Sullivan, a 17-year-old high school girl who struggles to get what she wants and who practices surfing at a high level.

In 2011, Zinser appeared in her first feature film, The Truth Below, a television film for MTV. She also joined the cast for the thriller Liars All, alongside Matt Lanter and Sara Paxton. In May 2012, Gillian announced that she was leaving the 90210 series. She also made an appearance in the Oliver Stone film, Savages.

Filmography

References

External links
 

21st-century American actresses
Actresses from Washington, D.C.
American film actresses
American television actresses
Living people
New York University alumni
American people of German descent
American people of Jewish descent
Year of birth missing (living people)